The Entrance Station at Devils Tower National Monument is a log cabin in the National Park Service Rustic style, built in 1941. The cabin is based on 1933 plans created by the National Park Service Landscape Division for a now-vanished caretaker's cabin at Aspenglen Campground in Rocky Mountain National Park, adapted by NPS architect Howard W. Baker of the Branch of Plans and Design for dual use as an entrance station and as a residence. It features a unique porch with rough-cut projecting log ends in a scooped pattern.

The interior was renovated in 1999, replacing the living spaces with office space.

See also
Entrance Road-Devils Tower National Monument
Old Headquarters Area Historic District
Tower Ladder-Devils Tower National Monument

References

External links

National Park Service Devils Tower First Fifty Years - The Early Years
National Park Service Devils Tower First Fifty Years - The 1930s
Devils Tower Entrance Station at the Wyoming State Historic Preservation Office

Government buildings completed in 1941
Houses completed in 1941
National Register of Historic Places in Devils Tower National Monument
Park buildings and structures on the National Register of Historic Places in Wyoming
National Park Service rustic in Wyoming
Buildings and structures in Crook County, Wyoming